Shark Reef Aquarium is a public aquarium on the Las Vegas Strip in Paradise, Nevada. It is located at and owned by the Mandalay Bay resort. The attraction opened on June 20, 2000. It also features a shark tunnel. The reef was developed in consultation with the Vancouver Aquarium.

History
Shark Reef was developed with help from the Vancouver Aquarium. It was built at a cost of $40 million, and was opened on June 20, 2000. Shark Reef received its 1 millionth visitor in May 2001, and had generated $10 million up to that point. It was accredited by the Association of Zoos and Aquariums in 2003.

As of 2017, Shark Reef had 80 workers, including 35 aquarists. The facility receives an annual 900,000 visitors on average.

In 2020, Shark Reef announced plans for a 36-seat virtual reality theater showing aquatic short films. It opened later that year.

Exhibits and animals 

The  facility is designed to resemble a sinking ancient temple. It includes the largest aquarium on the Las Vegas Strip, holding . Features include a shark tunnel, and a viewing area designed as the interior of a sunken ship. The  shipwreck tank, touted as the third largest in North America, is home to several endangered and threatened marine species including green sea turtles, Galapagos sharks, blacktip reef sharks, sand tiger sharks, and green sawfish.

Upon opening, it included the only indoor shark exhibit on the U.S. west coast, featuring 10 shark species. Other animals have included small stingrays, horseshoe crabs, moon jellyfish, and water monitors. Sharks generally do not hunt the other fish present in the aquarium, as they are kept well-fed. As of 2005, Shark Reef had more than 2,000 aquatic animals and reptiles, and one employee responsible for preparing their food. Large lights above the tank are used to indicate feeding time for the sharks. The facility spent $150,000 annually on food, equaling about 500 pounds per week. In total, the facility had 65 employees.

By 2007, the aquarium contained 15 types of sharks. In 2008, Shark Reef received a Komodo dragon from the Miami Zoo. Additional Komodos were introduced in 2013. By that time, the aquarium had also introduced a diving program, allowing guests to swim with the sharks. Guests can also feed the various animals, through a separate program introduced in 2013.

Two scalloped hammerheads were introduced in 2015, making Shark Reef one of three aquariums in the U.S. to feature the species. At the time, the aquarium contained 16 shark species representing 100 individuals. It also had 14 exhibits dedicated to the various animals. A new exhibit, introduced later in 2015, featured aquatic animals preserved through plastination.

Devils Hole pupfish 
In May 2006, two adult male Devils Hole pupfish were moved to Shark Reef from Devils Hole, while two adult females were relocated from a refuge at Hoover Dam, in hopes of augmenting the population. As of July 2020, these fish can be found in a small exhibit in the first section of the aquarium. Additionally, over 200 of the fish are in a breeding program in the sister site.

Great hammerhead shark
Shark Reef Aquarium was the first closed-system aquarium in North America to exhibit a great hammerhead shark. The female juvenile was less than four feet long when she was accidentally caught off the coast of Florida. The shark was successfully flown into Mandalay Bay in August 2001 on a record 16-hour flight in a special transportation tank designed specifically for it. It remained in a private quarantine tank for 2.5 years until the in-house aquarium husbandry team decided it had grown large enough where it would not fall prey to the other sharks in the exhibit tank. It measured six feet long when it was finally introduced among big public fanfare into the  tank on November 3, 2003, for public exhibition. After more than a year on exhibit, the specimen died suddenly and unexpectedly on December 16, 2004. A necropsy later attributed an intestinal infection as the cause of death.

Conservation and sustainability 
Members of the Shark Reef staff participate in the "Adopt-a-Cove" program to aid in the clean up of Lake Mead. Within the map and guide handed out at the park, they offer an "In Good Taste" guide that folds up into a business card size pamphlet to promote sustainable seafood choices. The information found within this guide is credited to the Monterey Bay Aquarium Foundation. Throughout the various exhibits, there is signage to educate the audience about the dangers of shark finning, introducing invasive species (like lion fish), and various other harmful practices.

Notes

External links 

Las Vegas Animal Exhibits

Aquaria in Nevada
Tourist attractions in the Las Vegas Valley
Mandalay Bay